Cynosaurus is an extinct genus of cynodonts. Remains have been found from the Dicynodon Assemblage Zone in South Africa. Cynosaurus was first described by Richard Owen in 1876 as Cynosuchus suppostus. Cynosaurus has been found in the late Permian period. Cyno- is derived from the Greek word kyon for dog and –sauros in Greek meaning lizard.

Paleoenvironment 

Fossils of Cynosaurus have been found in the Cistecephalus and Daptocephalus Assemblage Zones, in the Balfour Formation of the Beaufort Group, pertaining to the Karoo Supergroup of South Africa. In the Karoo Basin of South Africa riverbanks would be over flooded creating floodplains that could hold all that water to start soil accumulation. In the lower Balfour Formation, the soil deposits suggest a lacustrine environment with abundant leaf impressions (Viglietti et al., 2018). This suggests that there was coastal marshes and swamps. There was also trace fossils found in the formation from aquatic organisms.

History and discovery 
Cynosaurus was first described by Richard Owen in 1876. Owen wrote and journal titled “Descriptive and illustrated catalog of the fossil reptilia of South Africa in the collection of the British Museum” in 1876. Owen named the fossil Cynosuchus suppostus Owen, 1876 which later gets renamed as Cynosaurus by K. Schmidt in 1927. Owen described Cynosuchus suppostus as similar to Cynochampea in where the incisors and canines are located. The difference is that Cynosuchus suppostus had smaller and more upward location of nostril. The external nostril of Cynosuchus suppostus along with the forends of the upper and lower jaws were close in location with the nostril nearly horizontal. Owen described the molar teeth as relatively larger in size. Owen also noted the constriction of the upper jaw as it recedes and is combined with large molar teeth that shows Cynosuchus suppostus to have a broader and shorter skull. The nasal bones are broad and thick and overlapped by the maxillaries (Owen, 1876).

Description 
Derived traits for Cynosaurus are: subvertical mentum on anterior lower jaw, robust mandible with relative high horizontal ramus, broad snout up to 32% of skull length and adult Cynosaurus lacking pineal foramen (Van den Brandt et al., 2018). In early Cynodonts the parietal bone extends ventrally to the sidewall of the braincase (Rubidge et al., 2001). The epipterygoid is also expanded to make new contact with the frontal as well as the parietal crest is elongated to incorporate the pineal foramen (Rubidge et al., 2001).

Cranium 
The septomaxilla is the flat bridge that divides the nasal into upper and lower (Van den Brandt et al., 2018). The nasal is broader posteriorly than anteriorly (Van den Brandt et al., 2018). On the surface of the maxilla there are many small nutritive foramina forming two horizontal parallel lines (Van den Brandt et al., 2018). For the premaxilla there is a gap along the midline between the premaxilla and the palatal processes (Van den Brandt et al., 2018). The vomer is unpaired and tapers and reaches a point sharp (Van den Brandt et al., 2018). The vomer also doesn't reach the pterygoid posteriorly (Van den Brandt et al., 2018). Micro-CT scans allows internal structures of fossil skulls to be observed (Benoit et al., 2017). From micro-CT scans, a pair of ossification orbitosphenoid were observed in four specimens of Cynosaurus (Benoit et al., 2017). In orbitosphenoid consisted of two thin plate-like structures appear to articulate ventromedially and in cross section, it appears to be in an U-shape (Benoit et al., 2017).

The rapid evolution of the masseter insertion area is able to show early diversification of early Cynodonts (Botha et al., 2007). In Procynosuchus and Dvinia the location of masseteric fossa high on the coronoid process is seen as an initial stage of differentiation of masseter (Botha et al., 2007). In Cynosaurus and Nanictosaurus the extension of masseteric fossa is to the base of the dentary (Botha et al., 2007).

Parietal foramen 
On Cynosaurus there is a sharp sagittal crest that is flattened near the location of the parietal foramen (Benoit et al., 2015). In a CT scan of a Cynosaurus skull, no parietal tube was present but instead the endocranial cavity is pushed upward (Benoit et al., 2015). In Cynosaurus whaitsi, a specimen, was shown with the absence of parietal foramen (Benoit et al., 2015). In another Cynosaurus skull specimen, the absence of the parietal foramen was due to an ontogenetic change as in Massetognathus the parietal foramen closes in adults (Benoit et al., 2015). In the extant lizard Anolis carolinensis the size of the pineal opening decreases but doesn't disappear (Benoit et al., 2015). Another specimen showed evidence of a parietal tube, but the absence wasn't due to ontogeny but from intraspecific variability (Benoit et al., 2015).

Many lizards have a parietal eye on top of their head (Ralph, 1975). In extant ectotherms living near the equator are less frequent to have a pineal opening due to the stability of the environment that makes the third eye not useful (Benoit et al., 2015). There is a definite relationship between latitudinal distribution of lizards and parietal eye occurrence (Ralph, 1975). Parietal-eyeless lizards are to low latitudes which suggests an equatorial trait (Ralph, 1975).

Tooth 
Cynosaurus has simple canines with an ovoid shape that lack cingulum (Botha-Brink et al., 2007). The post canines are posterior accessory cusp and Cynosaurus have a second posterior accessory cusp in the posterior-most teeth (Botha-Brink et al., 2007). The anterior accessory cusps on Cynosaurus are not visible (Botha-Brink et al., 2007). Most early Cynodonts show triconodont postcanines in labial view (Botha-Brink et al., 2007).

Procynosuchus delaharpeae and Dvinia prima are more basal to Cynosaurus and have 5 or more upper and 4 or more lower incisors while most Cynodonts have 4 upper and 3 lower incisors (Botha-Brink et al., 2007). Progalesaurus is also basal to Cynosaurus and they have a strong longitudinal grooves or striations on their canines (Van den Brandt et al., 2018). Galesaurus who are more derived than Cynosaurus have an incomplete bony second palatine processes posteriorly (Van den Brandt et al., 2018).

See also 

 List of therapsids

References

Bibliography 
 Benoit, J., Abdala, F., Van den Brandt, M.J., Manger, P.R., Rubidge, B.S. 2015. Physiological implications of the abnormal absence of the parietal foramen in a late Permian cynodont (Therapsida). The Science of Nature. 102:69-72.
 Benoit, J., Jasinoski, S.C., Fernandez, V., Adbala, F. 2017. The mystery of a missing bone: revealing the orbitosphenoid in basal Epicynodontia (Cynodontia, Therapsida) through computed tomography. The Science of Nature. 104:66-75.
 Ralph, C.L. 1975. The pineal gland and geographical distribution of animals. International Journal of Biometeorology. 19(4):289-303.
 Owen, R. 1876. Descriptive and illustrated catalog of the fossil reptilia of South Africa in the collection of the British Museum.
 Rubidge, B.S., Sidor, C.A. 2001. Evolutionary patterns among Permo-Triassic therapsids. The Annual Review of Ecology, Evolution, and Systematics. 32: 449-480
 Van den Brandt, M.J., Adbala, F. 2018. Cranial morphology and phylogenetic analyses of Cynosaurus suppostus (Therapsida, Cynodontia) from the upper Permian of the Karoo Basin, South Africa. Palaeontologia africana. 52:201-221  
 Botha-Brink, J., Adbala, F. 2007. A new cynodont record from the Tropidostoma Assemblage Zone of the Beaufort Group: implications for the early evolution of cynodonts in South Africa. Palaeontologia africana. 43: 1-6  
 Botha, J., Adbala, F., Smith, R. 2007. The oldest cynodont: new clues on the origin and early diversification of the Cynodontia. Zoological Journal of the Linnean Society. 149: 477-492
 Viglietti, P.A., Smith, R.M.H., Rubidge, B.S. 2018. Changing palaeoenvironments and tetrapod populations in the Daptocephalus Assemblage Zone (Karoo Basin, South Africa) indicate early onset of the Permo-Triassic mass extinction. Journal of African Earth Sciences. 138: 102-111

Further reading

External links 
 The main groups of non-mammalian synapsids at Mikko's Phylogeny Archive

Prehistoric cynodont genera
Permian synapsids of Africa
Permian South Africa
Fossils of South Africa
Beaufort Group
Trace fossils
Fossil taxa described in 1927